Peeter Torop (born November 28, 1950, in Tallinn, Estonia) is an Estonian semiotician. Following Roman Jakobson, he expanded the scope of the semiotic study of translation to include intratextual, intertextual, and extratextual translation and stressing the productivity of the notion of translation in general semiotics. He is a co-editor of the journal Sign Systems Studies, the oldest international semiotic periodical, the chairman of the Estonian Semiotics Association and professor of semiotics of culture at Tartu University.

He is known in translation studies above all for his PhD dissertation Total translation, published in Russian in 1995, and in Italian in 2000 (1st edition) and 2010 (2nd edition), edited by Bruno Osimo.

References 

1950 births
Living people
Estonian semioticians
Academic staff of the University of Tartu
Translation scholars
People from Tallinn
Recipients of the Order of the White Star, 4th Class